Helmut Cichoń (born 11 March 1929) was a Polish footballer. He played in four matches for the Poland national football team from 1954 to 1955.

References

External links
 
 

1929 births
Possibly living people
Polish footballers
Poland international footballers
Sportspeople from Bytom
Association football defenders
Polonia Bytom players